Cheshmeh Gelineh (also Romanized as Cheshmeh Gelīneh; also known as Cheshmeh Gīneh) is a village in Cheleh Rural District, in the Central District of Gilan-e Gharb County, Kermanshah Province, Iran. At the 2006 census, its population was 70, in 15 families.

References 

Populated places in Gilan-e Gharb County